Helen "Baby Bunny" Smith (1888–1951), was an American sideshow performer. She made her living traveling with sideshows in the early 20th century billed as a circus fat lady.

She was born in 1888. Despite a normal childhood she became very heavy during grammar school. She left school and took a job as a sideshow performer at the age of 13. Her weight ballooned to as much as 689 lbs. She was billed as "Baby Bunny Smith" during her sideshow career and settled at Coney Island. She met her husband, 58 lb Peter Robinson, a fellow sideshow performer known and billed as "'the human skeleton", in the cult film classic Freaks. They had two children

References

1888 births
1951 deaths
Sideshow performers